Mount Fury, elevation ,  is in North Cascades National Park in the U.S. state of Washington. Several small glaciers are on the slopes of Mount Fury, and it is the highest peak in the Picket Range . A theodolite survey of West and East Fury on Oct 22, 2022, established the altitudes of the two peaks of Fury.  West Fury was set at 8,305ft +/-10 feet and East Fury as 8,356 +/- 8ft.   This makes East Fury one of the 100 highest peaks in the State of Washington.  Luna is now the second highest peak in the Picket Range.

Climate

Mount Fury is located in the marine west coast climate zone of western North America. Most weather fronts originate in the Pacific Ocean, and travel northeast toward the Cascade Mountains. As fronts approach the North Cascades, they are forced upward by the peaks of the Cascade Range, causing them to drop their moisture in the form of rain or snowfall onto the Cascades (Orographic lift). As a result, the west side of the North Cascades experiences high precipitation, especially during the winter months in the form of snowfall. During winter months, weather is usually cloudy, but, due to high pressure systems over the Pacific Ocean that intensify during summer months, there is often little or no cloud cover during the summer. Because of maritime influence, snow tends to be wet and heavy, resulting in high avalanche danger.

Geology

The North Cascades features some of the most rugged topography in the Cascade Range with craggy peaks, spires, ridges, and deep glacial valleys. Geological events occurring many years ago created the diverse topography and drastic elevation changes over the Cascade Range leading to the various climate differences.

The history of the formation of the Cascade Mountains dates back millions of years ago to the late Eocene Epoch. With the North American Plate overriding the Pacific Plate, episodes of volcanic igneous activity persisted.  In addition, small fragments of the oceanic and continental lithosphere called terranes created the North Cascades about 50 million years ago.

During the Pleistocene period dating back over two million years ago, glaciation advancing and retreating repeatedly scoured the landscape leaving deposits of rock debris. The "U"-shaped cross section of the river valleys are a result of recent glaciation. Uplift and faulting in combination with glaciation have been the dominant processes which have created the tall peaks and deep valleys of the North Cascades area.

References

External links

North Cascades National Park National Park Service
Aerial photo of Fury PBase.com
[Eric Gibertson, PhD, Seattle University * Eric Gibertso 

Mountains of Washington (state)
North Cascades National Park
Mountains of Whatcom County, Washington